Saab Training and Simulation is a company with its headquarters in Huskvarna, Sweden.

It is a subsidiary of Saab AB that produces military and security training systems. For the army market they provide target equipment for military training, mobile data communication systems, laser simulator systems and combat training systems. For the air force market they provide support.

Saab Training Systems has about 400 employees and subsidiaries in Czech Republic (about 120 employees), USA, UK, Germany, Norway, Finland, the Netherlands and Canada. The company exports to nearly 20 countries and the export is almost 95% of its profitability. 

Saab Training and Simulation used to be known as Saab Training Systems AB.

Training
Precision gunnery and skills training
Tactical training
Live fire training
Urban operations training 

Tactical training is the most complex of the categories because the entire session is recorded on a computer. When a soldier participates in a training session, he/she wears a vest with small loudspeakers, a radio antenna and built in GPS. The helmet has laser detectors and reflectors. Via a radio network the GPS is able to send location information to the tablet and the commander. The commander then can supervise the movements of the troops. The commander can also give commands to soldiers via a Saab-developed Radio Communications system called DAN (data acquisition network.)

Simulation and training
.50 Cal Trainer, Advanced
After Action Review Pro
AT4 Trainer
Armor Target Systems
BT 46 Laser Simulator
BT 46 Mk II
Carl-Gustaf Trainer
CLS (Contractor Logistical Support)
COS (Contractor Operational Support)
DITS - Deployable Instrumented Training System
ExPERT
ExTerm
GAMER Manpack
Helicopter Firing System
Infantry Soldiers Accessories
JAVWES – a full-spectrum fire-and-forget trainer
Logistic & Support Services
MILES Interface
Observer/Controller PDA Software
PDD - Personnel Detection Device
Precision Gunnery Training System
Range Control Systems
Small Arms Transmitter – SAT
Tactical Urban Training
Universal Target System
Virtual simulators (E-COM)

Notes and references

External links
 Saabgroup
 E-COM

Defence companies of Sweden
Saab